Joe Meyer (born 27 October 1970) is a New Zealand equestrian. He competed in eventing at the 2008 Summer Olympics in Beijing.

References

1970 births
Living people
New Zealand male equestrians
Olympic equestrians of New Zealand
Equestrians at the 2008 Summer Olympics